Epauto Seventh-day Adventist Junior Secondary School is a coeducational Christian secondary school in Port Vila, Vanuatu, established in 2004.

Academics
Each week, the school offers for Years 8 to 10:

For Year 11, Vanuatu Senior Secondary Certificate courses are being taught in 2008. This includes:
English
Mathematics
Biology
Geography
Chemistry
Physics
Accounting
Economics

Student life
The school provides an hour of physical education for each class; and an hour work line on Wednesday afternoon and 30 minutes on Friday afternoons.

STUDENTS UPDATE:

In 2014, the total number of students at Epauto Seventh-day Adventist Junior Secondary School is 417.

See also
List of Seventh-day Adventist secondary schools
 
On 20 June 2014, students and teachers fundraise for their new classroom buildings by a "Walkathon" from KORMAN STADIUM to TEOUMA SHOPPING.

References

External links
Official Website

EAH
EAH
Secondary schools affiliated with the Seventh-day Adventist Church
2004 establishments in Vanuatu